Girart de Vienne is a late twelfth-century (c.1180) Old French chanson de geste by Bertrand de Bar-sur-Aube.  The work tells the story of the sons of Garin de Monglane and their battles with the Emperor Charlemagne, and it establishes the friendship of the epic heroes Olivier and Roland.

The poem comprises more than 6000 rhymed decasyllable verses  grouped into laisses.  It was likely based on a now lost earlier poem.  The work was extremely popular up until the Renaissance, and was converted into a version with alexandrines (14th century) and five prose versions, including one by David Aubert (in his Chroniques et conquestes de Charlemagne), one by Raffaele Marmora, one by Jean d'Outremeuse, and one attached to the prose version of Garin de Monglane.

Plot
In the beginning, each of the four sons of Garin de Monglane—Hernaut, Girart, Renier and Milon—comes into possession of a fief (Renier becomes the father of Olivier).  But the son of Hernaut, Aymeri, becomes enraged when he hears the Empress bragging about how she once had humiliated his uncle Girart, and he incites the brothers to battle.  In an attempt to end the war, Olivier is pitted against the nephew of the Emperor, Roland, in a duel near Vienne, but neither hero prevails and, when night comes, an angel tells the two heroes to save their strength for battling infidels.  The two swear each other eternal friendship and Roland proposes to Olivier's sister, Aude.  Girart is reconciled with his emperor, but before Roland and Aude's marriage can take place, a messenger announces the arrival of Saracens in Gascony.

The "three cycles"
This work is also famous for grouping the chansons de geste or "Matter of France" into three cycles, each named after a chief character or ancestral figure: the "Geste du roi" (concerning Charlemagne and his knights), the "Geste de Doon de Mayence" (concerned with rebels against royal authority and its most famous characters were Renaud de Montauban and Girart de Roussillon), and the "Geste de Garin de Monglane" (whose central character was William of Orange; these dealt with knights who were typically younger sons without an inheritance who sought land and glory through combat with the Saracens).  The exact description is as follows:

Editions and translations
 Girart de Vienne, ed. by Wolfgang van Emden (Paris: SATF, 1977)
 The Song of Girart of Vienne by Bertrand de Bar-Sur-Aube: A Twelfth-Century Chanson de Geste, trans. by Michael A. Newth (Tempe: Arizona Center for Medieval and Renaissance Studies, 1999)

References

References
 Geneviève Hasenohr and Michel Zink, eds.  Dictionnaire des lettres françaises: Le Moyen Age.  Collection: La Pochothèque.  Paris: Fayard, 1992. 
 Urban T. Holmes Jr.  A History of Old French Literature from the Origins to 1300.  New York: F.S. Crofts, 1938.

12th-century books
Chansons de geste
Characters in epic poems
French poems
Epic poems in French
Matter of France

fr:Girart de Roussillon